Natatolana is a genus of crustaceans in the family Cirolanidae, first described by Niel L. Bruce in 1981.  The type species is Cirolana hirtipes Milne Edwards, 1840.

It is found at depths of about 200 m, in waters off the coasts of all Australian states, and also the Australian territory of Ashmore and Cartier Islands.

Species 
WoRMS lists over 70 species:
Natatolana albicaudata 
Natatolana amplocula 
Natatolana angula 
Natatolana anophthalma 
Natatolana aotearoa 
Natatolana arcicauda 
Natatolana arrama 
Natatolana boko 
Natatolana borealis 
Natatolana bowmani 
Natatolana brucei 
Natatolana bulba 
Natatolana buzwilsoni 
Natatolana caeca 
Natatolana californiensis 
Natatolana carlenae 
Natatolana chilensis 
Natatolana corpulenta 
Natatolana curta 
Natatolana debrae 
Natatolana endota 
Natatolana femina 
Natatolana flexura 
Natatolana galathea 
Natatolana gallica 
Natatolana gorung 
Natatolana gracilis 
Natatolana helenae 
Natatolana hirtipes 
Natatolana honu 
Natatolana imicola 
Natatolana insignis 
Natatolana intermedia 
Natatolana japonensis 
Natatolana kahiba 
Natatolana karkarook 
Natatolana laewilla 
Natatolana lilliput 
Natatolana longispina 
Natatolana lowryi 
Natatolana luticola 
Natatolana matong 
Natatolana meridionalis 
Natatolana nammuldi 
Natatolana narica 
Natatolana natalensis 
Natatolana natalis 
Natatolana neglecta 
Natatolana nitida 
Natatolana nukumbutho 
Natatolana obtusata 
Natatolana oculata 
Natatolana pallidocula 
Natatolana paranarica 
Natatolana pastorei 
Natatolana pellucida 
Natatolana pilula 
Natatolana prolixa 
Natatolana rekohu 
Natatolana rossi 
Natatolana rusteni 
Natatolana sinuosa 
Natatolana taiti 
Natatolana tenuistylis 
Natatolana thalme 
Natatolana thurar 
Natatolana valida 
Natatolana variguberna 
Natatolana vieta 
Natatolana virilis 
Natatolana woodjonesi 
Natatolana wowine 
Natatolana zebra

References

External links 

 Natatolana occurrence data from GBIF

Cymothoida
Crustaceans of Australia
Crustaceans described in 1993
Taxa named by Niel L. Bruce
Isopod genera